Dysspastus baldizzonei is a moth of the family Autostichidae. It is found on Crete.

References

Moths described in 1977
Dysspastus
Moths of Europe